Atkins is an unincorporated community in Morrill County, Nebraska, United States.

History
Atkins was a station on the Chicago, Burlington and Quincy Railroad. The community was named for Col. A. W. Atkins.

References

External links

Unincorporated communities in Morrill County, Nebraska
Unincorporated communities in Nebraska